The Tell-Tale Heart is an 1843 short story by Edgar Allan Poe.

The Tell-Tale Heart may also refer to:

Films
The Tell-Tale Heart (1928), a 20-minute American silent film co-directed by Leon Shamroy and Charles Klein
The Tell-Tale Heart (1934 film), also known as Bucket of Blood, a British film directed by Brian Desmond Hurst
The Tell-Tale Heart (1941 film), an American drama film
The Tell-Tale Heart (1953 American film), an animated film
The Tell-Tale Heart (1953 British film), a short film starring Stanley Baker
The Tell-Tale Heart (1960 film), a British horror film
The Tell-Tale Heart (1961 film), an Australian ballet
The Tell-Tale Heart (2014 film), a horror film

Music
"The Tell-Tale Heart" (song), track on The Alan Parsons Experience's 1976 Tales of Mystery and Imagination album
"The Tell-Tale Heart", a track from the Tourniquet album Crawl to China

See also
 Tell Tale Hearts, a BBC Scotland television serial drama
 "The Telltale Head", an episode of The Simpsons TV series based on the Poe story